Bucine is a comune (municipality) in the Province of Arezzo in the Italian region Tuscany, located about  southeast of Florence and about  west of Arezzo.

Subdivision
Bucine borders the following municipalities: Castelnuovo Berardenga, Civitella in Val di Chiana, Gaiole in Chianti, Monte San Savino, Montevarchi, Pergine Valdarno, Rapolano Terme.
Although the town of Bucine is limited in extent, the municipality includes lots of small villages, including, among others, Ambra, Badia Agnano, Badia a Roti, Capannole, Cennina, Levane, Mercatale-Torre, Montebenichi, Pietraviva, Pogi, Rapale, San Leolino, San Pancrazio.

Economy
Valentino Shoes Lab, a factory of the fashion brand Valentino, is located in Bucine. The factory was destroyed by fire between April 1 and 2, 2021.

Main sights
Many buildings of high historic value are present within the borders of the municipality, but the most important ones are: 
 Chiesa di San Giovanni Battista (1518 C.E.), 
Chiesa della Madonna del San Salvatore (probably XIII sec. C.E.), 
 Circolo MCL (1901).

References

External links

 Official website

Cities and towns in Tuscany